Leona Maricle (December 23, 1905 – March 25, 1988) was an American stage and film actress known for "distinctive characterizations of colorful ladies."

Maricle was a graduate of the College of Industrial Arts. Her Broadway debut came in The Trial of Mary Dugan (1927). Her final appearance on Broadway was in Never Too Late (1962).

In the mid-1930s, she and her husband were active in summer stock theatre in Skowhegan, Maine.

Her husband Louis Jean Heydt was a character actor in films from the 1930s through the 1950s. They divorced. She did not remarry. 

On March 25, 1988, Maricle died of an apparent heart attack in her apartment in Manhattan. Her obituary in The New York Times gave her age as 81. She was survived by a cousin, Marijane Maricle of Manhattan, and a niece, Joan Hickman of Lake Charles, Louisiana.

Selected filmography
 O'Shaughnessy's Boy (1935)
 Theodora Goes Wild (1936)
 Women of Glamour (1937)
 Woman Chases Man (1937)
 The Lone Wolf in Paris (1938)
 Curtain Call (1940)
 Under Age (1941)
 My Reputation (1946)

References

Bibliography
 Blottner, Gene. Columbia Noir: A Complete Filmography, 1940-1962. McFarland, 2015.

External links

1905 births
1988 deaths
American film actresses
American stage actresses
Actresses from Texas
People from Wichita Falls, Texas
20th-century American actresses